Roman Baroque may refer to either:

 Styles in Rome of any form of the arts in the Baroque period, roughly from 1600 to the late 18th century. Rome was a leading centre for Baroque architecture and Baroque painting in particular.
 Styles in ancient Roman art and Roman architecture, mainly of the middle Imperial period, where many aspects of the modern baroque style are also found.

Baroque architecture in Rome